Donar is a Dutch professional basketball club based in Groningen. The club made its debut in international competitions in 1974 in the 1974–75 FIBA Korać Cup. Since then, Donar has played in European competitions in 19 seasons organised by FIBA Europe or Euroleague Basketball.

List of games
Aggregate results list Donar's point tally first. All statistics are updated as of 8 December 2022.

Colour key

Key

QR = Qualifying round
R1 = First round
R2 = Second round
RS = Regular season
R16 = Round of 16
QF = Quarterfinals
SF = Semifinals
OT = After overtime
N = Neutral venue

Non-FIBA competitions
In 2006, Donar (then known as Hanzevast Capitals) played in the Haarlem Basketball Week, an International tournament in Amsterdam hosted during the winter break. Six years later, in 2012, the team hosted the Groninger Basketball Week at the MartiniPlaza.

Overall record
All statistics are correct as of 8 December 2022.
Colour key

By country

By club

Notes

References

International competitions